Valencia de Don Juan (Coyanza in Leonese language) is a municipality located in the province of León, Castile and León, Spain. In 2013, the municipality had a population of 5,199.

Originally, Valencia de Don Juan was named Comeniaca and Castrum Covianca in Roman times. In the High Middle Ages, it appeared as Cives Quoianka and Coyanza or Coyança (as it appears in the current seal, in addition to being evoked in the gentile "coyantino"). This lasted until the thirteenth century in which it was changed by Valencia de Campos, before renamed to the current name after its first lord and duke, Infante John of Portugal.

Language
Coyanza City Council promotes Leonese language courses.

See also
 Kingdom of León
 Leonese language
 Llión
 Province of Llión

References

External links

Municipalities in the Province of León